The Catholic hierarchy of South Africa is entirely Latin, composed of five ecclesiastical provinces, each under a Metropolitan Archbishop, with a total of 20 suffragan South African dioceses and an exempt pre-diocesan apostolic vicariate, as well as three suffragans (two dioceses, one apostolic vicariate) from below-mentioned neighbor states (fellow former British colonies).

Botswana has only one diocese and one apostolic vicariate, both suffragan of the South African Metropolitan Archbishop of Pretoria.
Swaziland only has a single diocese, suffragan of the South African Metropolitan of Johannesburg.
Neither of those warranting a nation Episcopal conference, their tiny episcopates partakes in the transnational Episcopal Conference of South[ern] Africa, despite its one-nation name.

None of them has an Eastern Catholic jurisdiction, only South Africa has an exempt Military ordinariate.

There are no titular sees. All defunct jurisdictions have current Latin successor sees.

There also is an Apostolic Nunciature to South Africa as papal diplomatic representation at embassy-level in the national capital Pretoria. There formally are an Apostolic Nunciature to Botswana and an Apostolic Nunciature to Swaziland, but both are vested in the Apostolic Nunciature to South Africa (as are the Apostolic Nunciature to Namibia and to the kingdom of Lesotho, which have their own Episcopal conferences).

Current Latin dioceses

Exempt (South Africa only) 
 Military Ordinariate of the South African Defence Force, vested in the Metropolitan Archdiocese of national capital Pretoria
 Apostolic Vicariate of Ingwavuma (pre-diocesan)

Latin provinces (including Botswana and Swaziland)

Ecclesiastical Province of Bloemfontein 
(South Africa only)
 Metropolitan Archdiocese of Bloemfontein
Diocese of Bethlehem
Diocese of Keimoes-Upington
Diocese of Kimberley
Diocese of Kroonstad

Ecclesiastical Province of Cape Town 
(South Africa only)
 Metropolitan Archdiocese of Cape Town
Roman Catholic Diocese of Aliwal
Roman Catholic Diocese of De Aar
Roman Catholic Diocese of Oudtshoorn
Roman Catholic Diocese of Port Elizabeth
Roman Catholic Diocese of Queenstown

Ecclesiastical Province of Durban 
(South Africa only)
 Metropolitan Archdiocese of Durban
Diocese of Dundee
Diocese of Eshowe
Diocese of Kokstad
Diocese of Mariannhill
Diocese of Umtata
Diocese of Umzimkulu
Apostolic Vicariate of Ingwavuma

Ecclesiastical Province of Johannesburg 
including all Eswatini
 Metropolitan Archdiocese of Johannesburg
Roman Catholic Diocese of Klerksdorp
Roman Catholic Diocese of Manzini, covering all and only Eswatini
Roman Catholic Diocese of Witbank

Ecclesiastical Province of Pretoria 
including all Botswana
 Metropolitan Archdiocese of Pretoria
Roman Catholic Diocese of Francistown in Botswana
Roman Catholic Diocese of Gaborone in Botswana
Roman Catholic Diocese of Pietersburg
Roman Catholic Diocese of Rustenburg
Roman Catholic Diocese of Tzaneen

See also 
 List of Catholic dioceses (structured view)

Sources and external links 
 GCatholic.org - data for all sections.
 Catholic-Hierarchy entry.

South Africa

Catholic dioceses
Catholic dioceses
Catholic dioceses